The German Figure Skating Championships are a figure skating national championship held annually to determine the national champions of Germany. Medals are awarded in the disciplines of men's singles, ladies' singles, pair skating, and ice dancing.

History

Unofficial German Figure Skating Championships were held from 1887 to 1889 in Hamburg. The first official competition was held in Munich in 1891 in the men's category only. In its early years, Germany and the Austrian part of Austria-Hungary had joint championships. The second German champion Georg Zacharias, for example, is from Vienna, as was Gustav Hügel, who won in 1894. The first German Nationals in pairs were held in 1907 in Altona, for ladies in Olmütz in 1911, and for ice dancing in Cologne in 1950. From 1949 to 1990 East and West Germany had separate national championships. In West Germany the winners were called German Champions and are therefore covered in the table below. In East Germany the winners were called GDR Champions (DDR-Meister). The medal winners of the National Championships in East Germany are listed in East German Figure Skating Championships.

In 1921, there was a dispute over eligibility. Pair skater Georg Velisch did not have citizenship of the Deutsche Reich and a protest was introduced to stop him from participating. Citizenship was not mentioned in the rules of the Deutsche Eislauf Verband but the 1921 pair competition was ultimately cancelled. In modern times, skaters without citizenship have competed in the championships.

In 1955, the results of the men's event were wrongly calculated. Months after the championships, referee Werner Rittberger noticed the mistake and awarded Tilo Gutzeit his gold medal.

Senior medalists

Men

Ladies

Pairs

Ice dancing

Junior medalists
The Junior championships are usually held as a separate event.

Men

Ladies

Pairs

Ice dancing

References

Sources
 "Jahrbuch 1989 - DEV" (Yearbook 1989 - German Skating Association), ISSN 0720-2075
 collected result lists of German Championships supplied by the DEU (German Figure Skating Association) 1947 to 1987
 Journal "Eis- und Rollsport", Nr. 4, 28 January 1937
 Journal "Eis- und Rollsport", Nr. 10, 15 January 1938
 Journal "Eis- und Rollsport", Nr. 9, 5 January 1939
 Journal "Eis- und Rollsport", Nr. 10, 15 January 1939
 Journal "Eis- und Rollsport",1941
 Der Eissport Nummer 13, 27 February 1930
 Der Eissport Nummer 10, 21 January 1929
 Der Eissport Nummer 11, 11 May 1925
 Der Eissport Nummer 9, 13 March 1925
 Der Eissport Nummer 9, 30 March 1926
 Der Eissport Nummer 1, 7 November 1924
 Der Winter 1920/1921, page 133
 Deutscher Eissport 1883-1886
 Deutscher Eissport, 21 January 1897, page 88
 Deutscher Eissport, 1896–1898
 Deutscher Eissport, 18 January 1900, page 96
 Deutscher Eissport, 7 February 1901, page 114
 Deutscher Wintersport, No. 11, 1904
 Deutscher Wintersport, No. 15, 1906
 Deutscher Wintersport, 1911–1913
 Deutscher Wintersport, No. 16, 29 March 1913
 Deutscher Wintersport, No. 11, 6 February 1914
 Deutscher Wintersport, No. 26, January 1917
 Deutscher Wintersport, 3 March 1919
 Deutscher Wintersport, 1 April 1920
 Deutscher Wintersport, 2 March 1921

External links

 Results at Deutsche Eislauf-Union

 
Figure skating national championships
Figure skating in Germany
Figure skating in West Germany